The Pictorial Jackson Review is the eighth album by English alternative rock band Felt, released in 1988. The name of the album is a play on the character Pictorial Review Jackson from Jack Kerouac's novel Pic.

Unusually, the first side of the record consisted of short indie pop songs with the second side containing just two instrumentals by keyboardist Martin Duffy. The tracks were originally demo recordings but they were judged good enough to release by label head Alan McGee.

In 2018, the album was remastered with a revised tracklisting, replacing Duffy's instrumentals with the previously unreleased recordings "Tuesday's Secret" and "Jewels are Set in Crowns" (which Lawrence would later adapt as "Ape Hangers" for his next band Denim). A much more realized version of "Tuesday's Secret" was originally released on the Space Blues EP in the 1980s before this other version saw the light of day on the remastered 2018 version of this album.

Track listing
All songs written by Lawrence, except where noted.

Personnel
Lawrence – vocals, guitar, Ace Tone electronic organ
Marco Thomas – guitar
Martin Duffy – organ, piano, Fender Rhodes bass piano
Mick Bund – bass
Gary Ainge – drums

References 

Felt (band) albums
1988 albums
Creation Records albums